The Roman Catholic Diocese of Guajará-Mirim is a diocese located in the city of Guajará-Mirim in the Ecclesiastical province of Porto Velho in Brazil.

History
 1 March 1929: Established as Territorial Prelature of Guajará-Mirim from Territorial Prelature of Porto Velho and Diocese of São Luíz de Cáceres
 16 October 1979: Promoted as Diocese of Guajará-Mirim

Bishops

Ordinaries, in reverse chronological order
 Bishops of Guajará-Mirim (Roman rite), below
 Bishop Benedito Araújo (2011.12.09 - present)
 Bishop Geraldo João Paulo Roger Verdier (1980.07.31 – 2011.12.09)
 Prelates of Guajará-Mirim (Roman Rite), below
 Bishop Luiz Roberto Gomes de Arruda, T.O.R. (1966.03.12 – 1978.11.03)
 Bishop Francisco Xavier Elias Pedro Paulo Rey, T.O.R. (1945.05.19 – 1966.03.12)

Coadjutor bishops
Luiz Roberto Gomes de Arruda, T.O.R. (1964-1966), as Coadjutor Prelate
Benedito Araújo (2011)

Auxiliary bishop
José María Pinheiro (1997-2003), appointed Auxiliary Bishop of São Paulo

References
 GCatholic.org
 Catholic Hierarchy
 Diocese website (Portuguese)

Roman Catholic dioceses in Brazil
Christian organizations established in 1929
Guajará-Mirim, Roman Catholic Diocese of
Roman Catholic dioceses and prelatures established in the 20th century